<noinclude>
Bowser is the main antagonist in the Mario videogame and media franchise.

Bowser may also refer to:

Liquid storage and delivery
Bowser (tanker), a generic name for a tanker of various liquids
Australian and South African English for a fuel dispenser at a filling station

People
Bowser (surname)
Bowzer, the nickname of Jon Bauman (born 1947), singer for the music group Sha Na Na, game show host, and television personality

Dogs and related characters in comics, literature and entertainment 
 A traditional name for a pet dog, such as
 Bowser, a former mascot dog of the Indiana Pacers basketball team – see Boomer
 Bowser, the title character of Bowser the Hound, a 1920 children's book by Thornton Burgess
 Bowser, Claire Bennett's pet dog in the American comic strip Moose & Molly
 Bowser, a puppy character in Pound Puppies, a 1986–1989 American animated television series
 Böwser vön Überdog, the bulldog primary antagonist in the American webcomic The Ongoing Adventures of Rocket Llama
 Rex "Bowser" Pointer, a policeman character with a robot dog in COPS (animated TV series)

Places
Bowser, British Columbia, Canada, a community
Bowser, Texas, United States, an unincorporated community
Mount Bowser, Ross Dependency, Antarctica
Bowser Valley, Victoria Land, Antarctica
Bowser Formation, a geologic formation in Alaska

Entertainment
 Bowser (Doctors), a fictional character from Doctors
 Bowser and Blue, a musical duo from Quebec, Canada who write and perform comedic songs
 Bowser Jr., Bowser's son and the secondary antagonist in the Mario franchise
 "Bowser", a song from Members Only, Vol. 3

Other uses
Bowser railway station, Victoria, Australia
Bowser Manufacturing, a manufacturer of model railroad items

See also
Browser (disambiguation)